The  is a Kofun period burial mound located in the Akibadai neighborhood of Ōtsu, Shiga in the Kansai region of Japan. The tumulus was designated a National Historic Site of Japan in 1921. With a total length of 122 meters, it is the third largest kofun in Shiga Prefecture.

Overview
The Chausuyama Kofun is located on a hill on the southern shore of Lake Biwa. It was originally covered in fukiishi and the shards of cylindrical and figurative haniwa have been found in the area. The location and construction of the burial chamber remains unknown as it has never been excavated. From its construction technique and haniwa, the tumulus is estimated to have been built from the end of the 4th century to the beginning of the 5th century AD, or the middle of the Kofun period.

There is a long tradition connecting this kofun to the family of Prince Ōtomo (c.648 - 672 AD), the son of Emperor Tenji, who committed suicide after his defeat by his uncle Prince Ōama in the Jinshin War. 

The tumulus is located about a 15-minute walk from Zezehommachi Station on the Keihan Electric Railway Ishiyama Sakamoto Line.

Overall length 122 meters
Posterior circular portion 70 meter diameter x 8 meter high 
 "Neck" portion 56 meters wide 
Anterior rectangular portion 58 meters wide x 60 meters long

Gallery

See also
List of Historic Sites of Japan (Shiga)

References

External links

Shiga Prefecture Department of Education 

Kofun
History of Shiga Prefecture
Ōtsu
Historic Sites of Japan